Quercus fabrei, or Faber's oak, is a species of deciduous oak tree found in China (Anhui, Fujian, Guangdong, Guangxi, Guizhou, Henan, Hubei, Hunan, Jiangsu, Jiangxi, south Shaanxi, Sichuan, Yunnan and Zhejiang provinces) as well as Hong Kong (Tai Po and Northern districts).

Faber's oak can take on the form of either a large shrub or a tree, with the latter form reaching up to 20 metres in height. The tree has elongated leaves, with the tip of the leaf being wider than the base. The leaves are serrated, although the teeth are smaller than those of more well-known oak species such as Quercus robur.

References

fabrei
Trees of China
Trees of Hong Kong
Endemic flora of China
Plants described in 1869